Bayram Çetin (born July 17, 1985 in Germany) is a Turkish professional footballer who plays for Kahramanmaraşspor.

Career

Kahramanmaraşspor
On 27 January 2020 it was confirmed, that Çetin had joined TFF Second League club Kahramanmaraşspor.

References

External links
 

1985 births
Living people
Turkish footballers
Kayserispor footballers
Göztepe S.K. footballers
İnegölspor footballers
İzmirspor footballers
Altınordu F.K. players
Fethiyespor footballers
Aydınspor footballers
Kahramanmaraşspor footballers
Süper Lig players
TFF First League players
TFF Second League players
Association football defenders